Dominik Jaroslav Duka O.P. (born 26 April 1943) is a Czech prelate of the Catholic Church who was archbishop of Prague from 2010 to 2022. He was made a cardinal in 2012. He was bishop of Hradec Králové from 1998 to 2010. He was Spiritual Protector and Chaplain General of the Orléans obedience of the Military and Hospitaller Order of Saint Lazarus of Jerusalem from 2012 to 2021.

Early years
Duka was born on 26 April 1943 in Hradec Králové in the Protectorate of Bohemia and Moravia (now in the Czech Republic). His father was an army officer who fought for the allied forces in World War II, based at RAF Cosford, who was later imprisoned in Czechoslovakia in the 1950s. Duka graduated from Tyl Grammar School in Hradec Králové in 1960 and worked in a factory and as an apprentice locksmith before entering military service from 1962 to 1964.

On 6 January 1969 he made his temporary profession as a member of the Dominicans and on 22 June 1970 he was ordained a priest by Cardinal Štěpán Trochta, Bishop of Litoměřice. For five years he worked in parishes of the Archdiocese of Prague and, on 7 January 1972, he made his solemn profession as a Dominican.

In 1975, the Communist government of Czechoslovakia revoked Duka's authorization to work as a priest. From then until the regime collapsed in 1989, Duka worked as a designer at the Škoda factory in Plzeň. At the same time he continued to work secretly as a Dominican and was elected Vicar Provincial, serving from 1975 until 1987. From 1976 to 1981, he taught theology to seminarians at the Theological Faculty of Litoměřice. In 1979, he obtained a licentiate in theology at the Theological Faculty of St. John the Baptist in Warsaw, Poland.

As a result of his activities with the Dominicans and his involvement in the publication of unauthorised samizdat literature, he was imprisoned in Bory Prison in Plzeň from 1981 to 1982, where his fellow prisoners included future Czech President Václav Havel. While in prison, Duka conducted a clandestine mass for other prisoners disguised as a chess club. From 1986 to 1998 he was Prior Provincial of the Dominicans in Bohemia and Moravia. From 1990 to 1998, he was a lecturer in the Faculty of Theology at Palacký University in Olomouc, teaching Introduction to Sacred Scripture and biblical anthropology.

Duka was elected to a three-year term as president of the Conference of Major Superiors of the Czech Republic in 1989. From 1992 to 1996 he was vice president of the Union of European Conferences of Major Superiors.

Bishop
On 6 June 1998 Duka was appointed bishop of Hradec Králové. He received episcopal consecration on 26 September 1998. On 13 February 2010, Pope Benedict XVI appointed him Archbishop of Prague. Duka was installed in Prague's St. Vitus Cathedral. On his appointment, Duka said:

One of Duka's chief concerns was the long-standing issue of the restitution of church property, which had been confiscated by the communist regime and which was either never fully returned or for which the church never received compensation. The Czech Republic is one of the last countries in Europe not to have ratified a treaty with the Holy See. After previous attempts at an agreement had failed –most notably in 2008 under Cardinal Miloslav Vlk –the Czech government in mid-January 2012 agreed to a compensation plan, under which the country's seventeen churches, both Catholic and Protestant, would get 56% of their former property now held by the state, an amount estimated at 75 billion koruna ($3.7 billion), and another 59 billion koruna ($2.9 billion) in financial compensation paid over the next thirty years. The state will also gradually stop covering the churches' expenses over the next seventeen years.

On 23 December 2011, Duka presided at the funeral liturgy of Václav Havel.

Cardinal
On 18 February 2012, Duka was made cardinal priest of Santi Marcellino e Pietro.
On 21 April 2012, he was appointed a member of the Congregation for Institutes of Consecrated Life and Societies of Apostolic Life and the Pontifical Council for Justice and Peace.

Duka was one of the cardinal electors who participated in the 2013 papal conclave that elected Pope Francis.

Duka contributed to a book Eleven Cardinals Speak on Marriage and the Family which urged fellow church leaders to maintain the church's rules regarding marriage and strengthen Catholic education about marriage and family life. The book was released before the world Synod of Bishops on the family in October 2015.

In May 2016, Duka claimed that the pope could not fully understand the refugee crisis because he is not from Europe. Duka has frequently spoken against Muslim immigration into Europe and has said that Muslims can only be considered a "safe presence" if they make up less than five percent of the population.

Duka has had several clashes with Templeton winner Tomáš Halík. In August 2015, Duka banned a conference by Jeannine Gramick, an American nun specialising in pastoral care for LGBT people, as well as the screening of a Polish film about a homosexual priest. In a statement setting out his objections, Duka said: "Most participants are not believers and have no intention of addressing their relationship with the Church. Since I do not think people with this sexual orientation are discriminated against in our country, it is not right for us to advocate things which are in direct conflict with the Catholic Church’s teachings."

In 2016, Halík criticized Duka for allegedly dissociating himself from the pope and for being too close to the Czech president Miloš Zeman. They disagree on Islam and its "violent tendencies". Halík also criticized Duka in October 2016, for accepting the highest state award from President Miloš Zeman, telling Právo: "On the 28 October national holiday, when Miloš Zeman was bestowing a medal on Dominik Duka for his support for Miloš Zeman, I remembered the words a former Pope, who commented on the death of Cardinal Richelieu — He said if God exists, the cardinal will probably have a lot to explain to him; if God does not exist, the cardinal did his job perfectly. I would be ashamed to accept an award from Miloš Zeman. However, Cardinal Duka seems to have got on a train he will never have the courage to leave. This makes me sorry."

In February 2018, a group of Czech Catholic laymen wrote a letter to Pope Francis, expressing concern about Duka's closeness to Czech politicians including Václav Klaus, Miloš Zeman and Tomio Okamura, and urging him not to extend Duka's term as archbishop when he submitted his resignation as required upon turning 75 in April 2018.

On 13 May 2022, Pope Francis accepted his resignation as archbishop.

Awards and honours
 Grand Cross and Chaplain General of the Orleans obedience of the Order of Saint Lazarus. Duka was stripped of the Grand Cross and his appointment as Chaplain General was revoked by exclusion from the Order by Grand Master Count Jan Dobrzenský z Dobrzenicz on 1 January 2021.
 Doctor honoris causa from the Faculty of Theology of the University of Fribourg, Switzerland (15 November 2010)
On 28 October 2001, Duka was awarded the I Grade Medal of Merit for the Czech Republic by President Havel.
On 2 June 2003, he was awarded the II Grade Cross of Merit.
On 3 June 2008, the I Grade Cross of Merit by the Minister of Defense Vlasta Parkanová.
On 20 June 2007, he was awarded the Grand Cross "Pro Piis Meritis" of the Sovereign Military Order of Malta.

References

Bibliography

External links

 
 
 Personal website

Czech cardinals
Cardinals created by Pope Benedict XVI
1943 births
Living people
Roman Catholic archbishops of Prague
People from Hradec Králové
Recipients of Medal of Merit (Czech Republic)
Recipients of the Order pro Merito Melitensi
Recipients of the Order of Saint Lazarus (statuted 1910)
Czech Dominicans
Dominican cardinals
Czech archbishops